Roma wa la n'toura (English: Rome Rather Than You; French: Rome plutôt que vous) is a 2006 Algerian-French-German drama film directed by Tariq Teguia and starring Samira Kaddour and Rachid Amrani as two young people who seek to leave Algeria and the Algerian Civil War behind for a brighter future. This is Teguia's feature film directorial debut. (He had previously made a few shorts and a 2002 documentary.) The film won the Special Jury Award at the 2007 Fribourg International Film Festival.

Plot
Twenty-year-old Kamel and his friend, twenty-three-year-old Zina, search Algiers for human trafficker Bosco to obtain forged passports so they can leave the country for Rome.

Reception
Variety magazine critic Robert Koehler praised "Tariq Teguia’s highly accomplished debut ... Although the final moments are foreseeable, both the getting there and the immediate aftermath show Teguia to be a director of major promise". Koehler also approved of the "naturalistic, easygoing perfs [performances]" of Kaddoui and Amrani. In Slant Magazine, however, Eric Henderson considered the film to be "arrogantly conceived, pretentiously executed, and petulantly protracted".

Cast
 Samira Kaddour as Zina
 Rachid Amrani	as Kamel
 Ahmed Benaissa as The policeman
 Kader Affak as Malek
 Lali Maloufi as Merzak
 Moustapha Benchaïb as Mahmoud
 Khaddra Boudedhane as Zina's mother
 Rabbie Azzabi as Young man in sportswear
 Fethi Ghares as Young man in working overalls

References

External links

Algerian drama films
2006 directorial debut films
2006 films
French drama films
Films set in Algeria
Films set in Algiers
2000s French films